Weinviertel DAC is an official wine region in Austria and was  the first controlled designation of origin in Austria. The region produces  also almost half of the  worldwide total of Grüner Veltliner.
Weinviertel DAC is aromatic and spicy, with pepper notes, no botrytis, and no oak notes. Weinviertel DAC Reserve is dry, full-bodied, spicy, with subtle botrytis notes and oak aging both allowed.

References 

Austrian wine
Districtus Austriae Controllatus
Wine regions of Austria